Yermolkino is a rural locality (a selo) and the administrative centre of Yermolkinsky Selsoviet, Belebeyevsky District, Bashkortostan, Russia. The population was 625 as of 2010. There are 5 streets.

Geography 
Yermolkino is located 18 km northwest of Belebey (the district's administrative centre) by road. Adelkino is the nearest rural locality.

References 

Rural localities in Belebeyevsky District